Rebecca Sanders (born 9 July 1982) was an Australian field hockey player who represented the Hockyroos a total of 106 times with 17 goals.

Club level 
Rebecca started playing hockey at around 7 years of age for Raby Hockey Club within Campbelltown City Women's Hockey Association

Australian Hockey League 
Rebecca was part of the NSW Arrows Hockey Team from 2001 to 2009 and won the Women's Australian Hockey League Player of the tournament in 2007.

She was part of the gold medal-winning NSW Arrows team in 2009 beating the Qld Scorchers 5–3 in the final  scoring a total of 7 goals during this tournament to be the second highest goal scorer.

International hockey 
Rebecca competed in a number of major international tournaments including:
 2001 FIH Junior World Cup (3rd place)
 2004 Champions Trophy (4th place)
 2005 Champions Trophy (2nd place)
 2006 Champions Trophy (5th place)
 2006 FIH World Cup (2nd place)
 2006 Commonwealth Games Melbourne (Gold medal)
 2007 Champions Trophy (4th place)
 2008 Champions Trophy (5th place)

Administration 
Rebecca was elected to the NSW Hockey Board of Directors on 27 November 2010 and held this position until 2016.

References

1982 births
Living people
Australian female field hockey players
Commonwealth Games medallists in field hockey
Commonwealth Games gold medallists for Australia
Field hockey players at the 2006 Commonwealth Games
21st-century Australian women
Medallists at the 2006 Commonwealth Games